Samois-sur-Seine is a commune in the Seine-et-Marne department in the Île-de-France region in north-central France.

It is located near Fontainebleau.

Culture
It is famous for being the town to which Django Reinhardt retired, and hosts an annual jazz festival in his honor. It was also the home to Reverchon Industries, a major global bumper car and other amusement ride producer. It is the birthplace of French jazz singer Cyrille Aimée. It has a lively community, with a primary school, a weekly market, a baker, a butcher, two cafés/bars, several restaurants and hotels. A bus also provides a link to the nearby town of Fontainebleau/Avon, the route of the world's first commercial trolleybus 1901–1913.

Demographics
Inhabitants of Samois-sur-Seine are called Samoisiens in French.

Literary reference and namesake
The town is mentioned in the 1954 novel Story of O as  the location of the fictional mansion managed by Anne-Marie, a lesbian dominatrix. In 1978, the name Samois was adopted by a lesbian-feminist BDSM organization based in San Francisco that existed from 1978 to 1983. It was the first lesbian BDSM group in the United States.

See also
Communes of the Seine-et-Marne department
Maud Gonne – The cemetery of Samois-sur-Seine is where in 1893 the English-born Irish republican revolutionary, suffragette, and actress Maud Gonne conceived Iseult Gonne in a sex magick ritual to reincarnate the soul of her dead son, in the crypt of the child's mausoleum, next to the coffin.

References

External links

The Django Reinhardt Jazz Festival 
Reverchon Website
Official site 
1999 Land Use, from IAURIF (Institute for Urban Planning and Development of the Paris-Île-de-France région)

Communes of Seine-et-Marne